A Gospel Book is a book, especially a manuscript book, containing gospels of the Christian New Testament.  See :Category:Gospel Books 

Many gospel books have no name except their library and catalogue number. Examples with articles include: 
Gospel Book (British Library, Add MS 40618), a late-8th-century illuminated Irish book with 10th-century Anglo-Saxon additions
Gospel Book (British Library, MS Egerton 768), a mid-9th-century illuminated Latin book from Northern France
Gospel Book (British Library, Royal MS 1. B. VII), an 8th-century Anglo-Saxon book
Gospel Book (Modena, Biblioteca Estense, Gr. I), Minuscule 585, a late-10th-century Byzantine book
Gospel Book (National Library of Greece, Codex 2603), a historic codex attributed to scribe Matthew of the Hodegon Monastery